Cockrum is an unincorporated community in Dunklin County, in the U.S. state of Missouri.

History
A post office called Cockrum was established in 1886, and remained in operation until 1895. The community has the name of J. C. Cockrum, an original owner of the site.

References

Unincorporated communities in Dunklin County, Missouri
Unincorporated communities in Missouri